Joint Force Maritime Component Command (JFMCC) (pronounced "Jiff-Mick"), is a United States Department of Defense doctrinal term.

The Joint Force Maritime Component Commander refers to an individual of flag officer that is responsible for maritime forces within a joint operations environment.  The term "maritime forces" encompasses "blue water" forces (i.e. naval ships) and "brown water" forces (i.e. amphibious units).

As defined in Joint Doctrine Document 1-02, the JFMCC is:

"The commander within a unified command, subordinate unified command, or joint task force responsible to the establishing commander for making recommendations on the proper employment of assigned, attached, and/or made available for tasking maritime forces; planning and coordinating maritime operations; or accomplishing such operational missions as may be assigned. The joint force maritime component commander is given the authority necessary to accomplish missions and tasks assigned by the establishing commander."

Confusion of term
While the position is usually held by a United States Navy officer in most joint warfighting environments, an officer of another service can be a JFMCC, if that service has the preponderance of maritime forces in theater and the means to command and control those forces (i.e. a Marine Corps unit commander).

See also
Air Operations Center (AOC)
Joint Force Land Component Commander (JFLCC)
Joint Force Air Component Commander (JFACC)

External links
Defense Technical Information Center: JP 3-0, Joint Operations, 17 September 2006, Change 2, 22 March 2010 
Defense Technical Information Center: Joint Publication 1-02, DOD Dictionary of Military and Associated Terms 8 November 2010, as amended through 31 January 2011

United States Department of Defense doctrine
Military terminology of the United States
United States Navy
United States Strategic Command